Woody Island is an island and former settlement in Placentia Bay, Newfoundland and Labrador.

History
Woody Island had a population of 261 persons in 1921. The community was resettled by a provincial government program in the 1960s. Many of the original buildings and houses are currently still on the island, including a stone house.

Economy
The primary economic activity on Woody Island is the fishery. Fishermen harvest cod, crab, lobster, and scallops.  Other summer residents are employed is a tourism business, Woody Island Resort. This business employees about 20 people on a seasonal basis, including musicians, cooks and general staff for the resort. The original old shop has now been turned into a small museum featuring many items owned by previous inhabitants of Woody Island.

See also
Resettlement (Newfoundland)
Merasheen Island
Merasheen

References

External links
Maritime History Archive
Woody Island Resort

Ghost towns in Newfoundland and Labrador
Islands of Newfoundland and Labrador